Batmanghelidj, Batmanglij or Batmanghelidjh, is a Persian surname, and may refer to:

 Camila Batmanghelidjh (born 1963), a British psychotherapist, social entrepreneur and daughter of Fereydoon (despite the spelling variation)
 Fereydoon Batmanghelidj (1931–2004), an Iranian writer and naturopath
 Nader Batmanghelidj (1904–1998), Army officer and government official
 Najmieh Batmanglij (born 1947), an Iranian-American chef and writer and mother to Rostam and Zal
 Rostam Batmanglij (born 1983), an American musician and a member of the band Vampire Weekend, who is known mononymously as Rostam
 Zal Batmanglij (born 1981), an American film director and screenwriter born in Franc

See also
Batmanqelenj-e Sofla, a village in Hashtrud County, East Azerbaijan Province, Iran